BRI may refer to:

Organizations
 Bank Rakyat Indonesia, a bank in Indonesia
 Banque des Règlements Internationaux (Bank for International Settlements), an international body for cooperation between national central banks
 Brewers Retail Inc., operator of The Beer Store chain in Ontario
 Brigade de recherche et d'intervention (Research and Intervention Brigade), a French anti-gang police unit

Hospitals
 Bristol Royal Infirmary, a teaching hospital in Bristol, England
 Bradford Royal Infirmary, a teaching hospital in Bradford, West Yorkshire, England

Research institutions
 Breslov Research Institute, Hasidic rabbinical publisher
 Biblical Research Institute, of the Seventh-day Adventist Church
 Biosecurity Research Institute, at Kansas State University

Transportation
 Bari Airport (IATA code), Italy 
 Bristol Temple Meads railway station (National Rail code), England 
 Burlington-Rock Island Railroad (reporting mark), 1930-1965

Other uses
 Bri (Briana Babineaux) (born 1994), American gospel singer
 Basic Rate Interface, an ISDN configuration
 Basketball Related Income, issue in the 2011 NBA lockout
 Bathroom Readers' Institute, credited author of Uncle John's Bathroom Reader
 Belt and Road Initiative, Chinese strategy for extending trade and transport links to Central Asia and further west
 Brother Records Incorporated, the holding company and record label for The Beach Boys

See also
 Brian (nickname "Bri"), a male given name